Martin van Niekerk (born Izak Marthinus van Niekerk on 29 May 1989) is a South African-born Namibian cricketer. He is a right-handed batsman and right-arm medium-fast bowler. He was born in Pretoria.

Van Niekerk made his debut for the Under-19s during the 2007-08 Under-19s World Cup in February 2008, in which he played three matches, but only one during the competition proper, in which he didn't bat, but bowled four overs, taking figures of 1-18.

Van Niekerk made his first-class debut in February 2009, against Border. From the tailend, he scored 4 not out in the first innings in which he batted.

External links
Martin van Niekerk at CricketArchive 

1989 births
Afrikaner people
South African expatriates in Namibia
Living people
Cricketers from Pretoria
Namibian cricketers